Michael K. Davis is a former justice of the Wyoming Supreme Court; he served on the court from 2012 to 2022.

He received a Bachelor of Arts summa cum laude from Western State College of Colorado in 1977, and a Juris Doctor with Honor from the University of Wyoming College of Law in 1980.

He practiced law with the firm of Yonkee and Toner in Sheridan from 1980 to 2006, and from a Cheyenne branch office of the firm from 2006 until 2008, when he became a district judge. He is a Judicial Fellow of the American College of Trial Lawyers.

Davis retired on January 16, 2022.

References

External links
 Official Court Biography

|-

1952 births
Living people
20th-century American lawyers
21st-century American judges
21st-century American lawyers
Chief Justices of the Wyoming Supreme Court
Justices of the Wyoming Supreme Court
University of Wyoming College of Law alumni
Western Colorado University alumni
Wyoming state court judges